(born January 26, 1968) is a Japanese animator, illustrator and film director.

Something of a protégée of Yoshiaki Kawajiri, he was also influenced by Yoshinori Kanada, Frank Miller, Mike Mignola, and Katsuhito Ishii. He went straight from a high school education to beginning his career at Madhouse as an in-betweener on works directed by Kawajiri after being interviewed by him. His first professional work as director is the title sequence of the 2000 film Party 7; while his first feature film is Redline, which premiered in 2009 and was released in 2010. He served as character designer and animation director for 2012's Lupin the Third: The Woman Called Fujiko Mine, and directs film continuations of it starting with Lupin the IIIrd: Daisuke Jigen's Gravestone in 2014. Work outside of animation includes the artwork for the 2004 Dreams Come True single "Yasashii Kiss o Shite".

Filmography

Director

Other work
The Foxes of Chironup Island (1987)  In-Between Animation
Wicked City (1987) -  In-Between Animation
Legend of Galactic Heroes: My Conquest is the Sea of Stars (1988) - Animation Check
Bride of Deimos (1988) Animation Check
Demon City Shinjuku (1988) - Animation Check
Legend of the Galactic Heroes 1st season (1988) - Key Animation (Ep 19)
Goku: Midnight Eye (1989) - Animation Check, Key Animation
Goku II: Midnight Eye (1989) - Key Animation
Yawara! A Fashionable Judo Girl (1989) Key Animation (Ep 1, 18)
Cyber City Oedo 808 (1990)  - 　Mechanical Animation Director,　Key Animation (Ep 1, 2, 3)
Teki wa Kaizoku: Neko no Kyoen (1990) Key Animation (Ep 1, 2)
Nineteen 19 (1990) Key Animation
A Wind Named Amnesia (1990) - Key Animation
Urusei Yatsura: Always My Darling (1991) - Key Animation
Doomed Megalopolis (1991) - Assistant Animation Director (Ep 1, 2), Key Animation (Ep 1, 2, 3)
Giant Robo: The Day the Earth Stood Still (1992) - Key Animation (Ep 1, 6)
Ninja Scroll (1993) - Key Animation
The Cockpit (1994) (segment Slipstream) - Key Animation
True Peakock King (1994) - Character Design, Key Animation
Clamp in Wonderland (1994) - Key Animation
Darkside Blues (1994) - Key Animation
Mighty Space Miners (1994) - Opening Animation, Ending Animation
DNA² (1996) - Mechanic Design, Opening Animation
Bio Hunter (1995) - Key Animation
Memories (1995) (segment Stink Bomb) - Key Animation
X (1996) - Key Animation
Birdy the Mighty (1996) - Key Animation (Ep 1-4)
Cardcaptor Sakura (1998) - Key Animation (Ep1, 57)
Jubei-chan - Secret of the Lovely Eyepatch (1999) - Animation Director (Ep 10, 11)
Cardcaptor Sakura: The Movie (1999) - Key Animation
Carried by the Wind: Tsukikage Ran (2000) - Key Animation (Op, Ep 1, 5)
Hidamari no Ki (2000) - Key Animation
Fighting Spirit (2000) - Key Animation (Op 1, Ep 20)
Cardcaptor Sakura Movie 2: The Sealed Card (2000) - Key Animation
Blood: The Last Vampire (2000) - Key Animation
Vampire Hunter D: Bloodlust (2000) - Setting Design, Key Animation
WXIII: Patlabor the Movie 3 (2002) - Key Animation
Texhnolyze (2003) - Key Animation (Ep1)
Dead Leaves (2004) - Key Animation
Samurai Champloo (2004) Key Animation (Opening Animation, Ep 5)
The Taste of Tea (2004) - Animation Director
Funky Forest (2005) - Animation Director
Iron Man (2010) - Mechanical Design, Key Animation (Ep 1, 7, 11)
Trigun: Badlands Rumble (2010) - Key Animation
Lupin the Third: The Woman Called Fujiko Mine (2012) - Character Design, Animation Director, Episode Animation Director (Ep 1, 13), Key Animation (Opening, Ep 13)
Yasuke (2021) - Character Design

References

External links
 
 
 Filmography:Takeshi Koike Sakuga@Wiki(Japanese)

Web Anime Style Animator Interview: Takeshi Koike (Japanese)

1968 births
People from Yamagata Prefecture
Anime directors
Album-cover and concert-poster artists
Japanese animators
Japanese animated film directors
Japanese film directors
Japanese illustrators
Living people
Madhouse (company) people